Alexander Wilson (7 June 1889 – 26 January 1954) was an Australian wheat farmer and federal politician who played a key role in the downfall of the Fadden Government in 1941.

Biography

Born in County Down, Ulster, Ireland (now in Northern Ireland), Wilson was educated in Belfast and migrated to Australia in 1908, becoming a farmer at Ultima, Victoria.

Wilson was a prominent leader of Victorian wheat growers who successfully stood as a candidate at the 1937 Australian election for the House of Representatives seat of Wimmera against the sitting Country Party member Hugh McClelland. Wilson and the Victorian state branch of the Country Party were opposed to the Coalition with the United Australia Party, with dissenting MPs such as McClelland disendorsed.

Often voting with the opposition Australian Labor Party, Wilson easily retained his seat at the 1940 Australian election and it was "common knowledge that Labor members were now working closely with Wilson". Prime Minister Arthur Fadden of the Country Party presided over a minority government, with Wilson and fellow cross-bencher Arthur Coles holding the balance of power in the House of Representatives.

In 1941, Wilson and Coles voted against the Budget, bringing down Fadden's government and handing government to Labor's John Curtin. Wilson supported the Curtin government from then on. Wilson remained in parliament until his retirement on 31 December 1945 to become the Administrator of Norfolk Island, a position he held until 1952. He retired to a farm at Swan Hill and died in 1954.

Sources
 Abjorensen, N. (2016) The Manner of Their Going, Australian Scholarly Publishing: Kew. .

References

1889 births
1954 deaths
Administrators of Norfolk Island
Australian farmers
Independent members of the Parliament of Australia
Members of the Australian House of Representatives for Wimmera
Members of the Australian House of Representatives
People from County Down
Farmers from Northern Ireland
20th-century Australian politicians